Daniel Hasler (born 18 May 1974) is a former Liechtenstein football defender and currently the assistant manager of FC Wil.

He is one of the most capped players for the Liechtenstein national football team, having appeared 78 times since his debut against Estonia in 1993. He last played for FC Vaduz.

Coaching career
On 27 November 2012, FC Vaduz announced that Hasler from 1 January 2013 would be the new assistant manager of the club under manager Giorgio Contini and continue to exercise in a dual role with his job at the national team.

Honours
Individual
Liechtensteiner Footballer of the Year: 1996–97, 2000–01, 2002–03

International goals

References

Liechtenstein international footballers
FC Vaduz players
FC Wil players
Liechtenstein footballers
1974 births
Living people
Association football defenders